Bill Eagles is a British film and television director. He is best known for directing the 2000 film Beautiful Creatures starring Susan Lynch and Rachel Weisz.

As a television director, he moved to Los Angeles in 2003 and worked for 10 years directing TV movies, mini series and episodic TV. Some his credits include CSI: Crime Scene Investigation, Gotham, Invasion, Cold Case, Numb3rs, Battlestar Galactica, Terminator: The Sarah Connor Chronicles, Threshold, Crash, Persons Unknown, Fringe and ‘’Pennyworth’’. He has also directed a number of television films in his native United Kingdom.

References

External links

Year of birth missing (living people)
Living people
British expatriates in the United States
British film directors
British television directors
English-language film directors
German-language film directors
Place of birth missing (living people)